Bathelium boliviense is a species of corticolous (bark-dwelling) lichen in the family Trypetheliaceae. Found in Bolivia, it was formally described as a new species in 2016 by lichenologists Adam Flakus and André Aptroot. It is only known to occur in similar habitats near the type locality, and in islands of Amazon forest located within Beni savanna. The lichen is somewhat similar to Bathelium lineare, but unlike that species, B. boliviense contains isohypocrellin in its pseudostromata. This lichen product is quite rare in the family Trypetheliaceae, known to occur only in another two Bolivian Bathelium species.

References

Trypetheliaceae
Lichen species
Lichens described in 2016
Lichens of Bolivia
Taxa named by André Aptroot
Taxa named by Adam Grzegorz Flakus